The National Collection of Yeast Cultures (NCYC) is a yeast culture collection, established in 1951, and working under the Budapest Treaty for the storage of over 4,000 yeast cultures. Located at the Institute of Food Research in Norwich, England, since 1980. NCYC is part funded by the UK government but provides a commercial service to identify, store and supply yeast cultures. As well as the traditional baking and brewing yeast Saccharomyces cerevisiae, this culture collection also contains hundreds of non-pathogenic yeast species. The yeasts are kept frozen under liquid nitrogen or freeze-dried in glass ampoules. To ensure the collection's safety, it is also duplicated and stored off site. Yeasts have been stored and revived successfully decades later.

References

External links 
 National Collection of Yeast Cultures 
 UK National Culture Collections

Beer organizations
Biological research institutes in the United Kingdom
British food and drink organisations
Microbiology organizations
Research institutes in Norfolk
Yeast banks